"Stranded" is a song by the American artist Plumb, released on the 1999 album candycoatedwaterdrops. It was included in films such as Dog Park and Drive Me Crazy, on the soundtrack from the latter movie and the WOW 2000 compilation album.

In 2009, the song was re-recorded and included on her Beautiful History compilation album  as "Stranded (2010)".

Jennifer Paige cover

"Stranded" was covered in 2001 by Jennifer Paige and was released as the second single from her second studio album Positively Somewhere (which also featured a cover of another Plumb song, "Here With Me"). This song became a massive airplay hit in some parts of Europe, most notably in Germany, where it reached top 10 positions on airplay charts. It was also popular in Japan and Italy.

Music video
The music video features Paige finding herself stranded on an isolated island where her car runs out of fuel and she ends up wandering in the beaches all alone. The video was shot in Spain and directed by David Mould.

Charts

References

Plumb (singer) songs
2002 singles
Jennifer Paige songs
Songs written by Matt Bronleewe
Songs written by Plumb (singer)
1999 songs